Star Hill Ponies is a British children's stop-motion animation series co-produced by Mike Young Productions and Bumper Films for S4C. It was the last production by Bumper Films before they shut down in February 2002. The voice actors are Josie Lawrence and Andrew Sachs.

Plot
The series follows a young girl named Baz who dreams of nothing more than finding a best friend. Her wish comes true when two roaming Welsh Mountain ponies Molly and Dylan, show up at her farm with Shetland pony Scruffy. Their playful frolics change her life forever.

Production
Starhill Ponies is co-produced by Mike Young Productions in Los Angeles, California, United States and Bumper Films in Wales, United Kingdom for S4C and BBC. It is Bumper Films' only TV series co-produced in the United Kingdom and North America. The series is distributed in the United Kingdom by S4C International and BBC Worldwide and worldwide by Taffy Entertainment.

Characters

Ponies
 Dylan - the big brown Welsh Mountain pony, with a black mane.
 Molly - the dapple grey Mountain pony, with a grey mane.
 Scruffy - is the podgy brown Shetland, with a long straw-coloured mane. His hobbies are eating and being naughty.

Humans
 Beatrice "Baz" Watkins -
 Will Watkins - Baz's father. 
 Kath Watkins - Baz's mother.
 Thomas - Baz's best friend. 
 Mrs Horace Morris - the snobbish landlay who can't stand ponies.
 Jim - 
 Ambrose Higgins - the half-witted beach shop owner.
 Lottie - the mobile shop owner. Only appears in Series 2.
 Nick - the blacksmith. Only appears in Series 2.

Episodes

Series 1 (1998-99)

Series 2 (2002)

 Just Desserts
 Apple Pie
 Hide and Seek
 Nothing to be Afraid Of
 Mrs. HM's Parade
 Tall Tales
 The Mystery of Missing Ethel
 A Fine Mess
 Scarypony Scarecrow
 Thomas Riding High
 The Unlucky Horseshoe
 The Way Home
 All I Want for Christmas

Merchandise

VHS Releases

In 1999, one single video of the show was by BBC Worldwide Ltd with five episodes from the first series on it.

DVD Releases
In 2006, the series was released on three DVDs by Blackhorse Entertainment.

References 

British children's animated adventure television series
S4C original programming
Television shows set in Wales
1990s British animated television series
2000s British animated television series